North Carolina Highway 192 (NC 192) is a proposed east-west primary state highway designation in the U.S. state of North Carolina. It will serve as the designation of an existing  segment of freeway between Interstate 40 (I-40) Winston-Salem and the Winston-Salem Northern Beltway near Union Cross, currently designated I-74 and formerly U.S. Route 311 (US 311). NC 192 will be designated when the final section of the Winston-Salem Northern Beltway opens sometime in 2026, at which point I-74 will be rerouted onto that road.
The highway is completed but not yet signed.

Route description 
The proposed state highway will begin at the junction of I-40 and I-74 in Winston-Salem and run east for  along what is today I-74, a four-lane freeway. After intersecting Ridgewood Road at a diamond interchange, the route will end near Union Cross at a future interchange with the Winston-Salem Northern Beltway, planned to be designated I-74.

History 
The freeway to become NC 192 was initially constructed in the 1980s as a realignment of US 311. It was designated I-74 in 2012, with signs being updated in 2014, despite the road's shoulders not being wide enough to meet Interstate Highway standards.

US 311 was removed from the road in 2019 after approval from AASHTO the previous year, with I-74 becoming the freeway's sole designation. Upon completion of the eastern section of the Winston-Salem Northern Beltway, I-74 will be rerouted onto that road. As a result, the NC 192 designation will be created on the current section of I-74 between I-40 and the new freeway.

Future 
A project has been proposed since at least 1991 by NCDOT and the city of Winston-Salem to construct a four-lane, limited-access boulevard from the terminus of the proposed NC 192 at I-40 to US 421 (Salem Parkway) at Exit 8. The road would feature a landscaped median and a parallel bicycle and pedestrian trail. The project has been called the US 311 Connector or the I-74 Connector. While it appears on planning maps on the Winston-Salem 2040 Metro Transportation Plan, it is not listed in the plan and no longer appears in the NCDOT State Transportation Improvement Program (STIP). Originally intended as an extension of the US 311 freeway, the connector would serve as an extension of NC 192, though official plans have not mentioned its designation since the truncation of US 311 to downtown Winston-Salem.

Exit list 
The entire route is in Forsyth County. The future exit numbers of the proposed route are unknown.

See also

References

External links 

 NCRoads.com: N.C. 192

192
Transportation in Forsyth County, North Carolina
Proposed state highways in the United States
Transportation in Winston-Salem, North Carolina
Interstate 74